The GA DE900 is a family of 4 axle Bo'Bo' diesel electric locomotives manufactured in Spain, by Meinfesa.

The class derive from the RENFE Class 311 type locomotive developed by MTM, Ateinsa and Babcock & Wilcox.

Operators

Switzerland

40 locomotives classified as SBB Am841 were produced for the state railways of Switzerland in 1994)

Israel
3 locomotives were manufactured for the Israel state railways (IR) in 1997.

Mexico
2 locomotives were manufactured for GEO RAILMEX of Mexico in 1997.

Egypt
The Egyptian National Railways ordered 30 similar locomotives of type GA-DE 900 AC in 2000.

References

Diesel-electric locomotives of Egypt
Diesel-electric locomotives of Israel
Diesel-electric locomotives of Mexico
Macosa/Meinfesa/Vossloh Espana locomotives